Xianjiao Island is an island in Baisha Township, Penghu Islands (the Pescadores) archipelago.

It is in the Taiwan Strait of the South China Sea, off the west coast of Taiwan.

See also
Islands of Taiwan

Baisha Township
Islands of the South China Sea
Islands of Taiwan
Landforms of Penghu County
Penghu Islands
Taiwan Strait